This is a list of journals published by the University of California Press.

List of journals
19th-Century Music
Advances in Global Health
Afterimage: The Journal of Media Arts and Cultural Criticism
American Biology Teacher
Asian Survey
Boom: A Journal of California
California History
California Management Review
Civic Sociology
Classical Antiquity
Contemporary Arab Affairs
Current History
Departures in Critical Qualitative Research
Ethnic Studies Review
Federal Sentencing Reporter
Feminist Media Histories
Film Quarterly
Gastronomica: The Journal of Critical Food Studies
Historical Studies in the Natural Sciences
International Review of Qualitative Research
Journal of Autoethnography
Journal of Medieval Worlds
Journal of the American Musicological Society
The Journal of Musicology
Journal of Palestine Studies
Journal of the Society of Architectural Historians
Journal of Vietnamese Studies
Latin American and Latinx Visual Culture
Mexican Studies/Estudios Mexicanos
Music Perception
National Review of Black Politics
New Criminal Law Review
Nineteenth-Century Literature
Nova Religio: The Journal of Alternative and Emergent Religions
Pacific Historical Review
The Public Historian
Religion and American Culture
Representations
Resonance: The Journal of Sound and Culture
Rhetorica
Sociology of Development
Southern California Quarterly
Studies in Late Antiquity

University of California Press

Journals